This is a list of heliports and helipads in Singapore:

Heliport
Sembawang Air Base

Helipads
Brani Naval Base
Ministry of Defence Headquarters (two)
Tan Tock Seng Hospital
Singapore General Hospital
Swissôtel The Stamford

See also
List of airports in Singapore

External links
Helicopter operation regulations in Singapore

 

Singapore
Singapore
Aviation in Singapore 
Heliports